Bryan Janssen (born 9 January 1995) is a Dutch footballer who plays as a goalkeeper for Kozakken Boys.

Career
He played professionally for FC Dordrecht.

From January 2020 to June 2022, Janssen played for ASWH. He signed with Kozakken Boys, starting summer 2022, after initially agreeing to continue with ASWH.

References

1995 births
Living people
Dutch footballers
Sparta Rotterdam players
FC Dordrecht players
Tweede Divisie players
Eerste Divisie players
Association football goalkeepers
People from Hook of Holland
ASWH players
RKVV Westlandia players
Kozakken Boys players
Footballers from South Holland